Upton Grammar may refer to:
 Upton Court Grammar School in Slough, Berkshire, England
 Upton Hall School FCJ, a girls' Roman Catholic grammar school with academy status located in Merseyside, England